Heath Burnett Haynes (born November 30, 1968) is former Major League Baseball pitcher. He batted and threw right-handed.

Career
He was signed by the Expos as an amateur free agent in 1991. Haynes briefly appeared in the majors in 1994 for the Expos, and also played in the minor leagues for the Oakland Athletics, California Angels, Boston Red Sox, Colorado Rockies, Florida Marlins, and Houston Astros. He also played for the Valley Vipers of the Western Baseball League and the Wei Chuan Dragons of the Chinese Professional Baseball League.

References

External links

1968 births
Living people
American expatriate baseball players in Canada
American expatriate baseball players in Mexico
American expatriate baseball players in Taiwan
Baseball players from West Virginia
Edmonton Trappers players
Guerreros de Oaxaca players
Harrisburg Senators players
Jamestown Expos players
Lake Elsinore Storm players
Linsly School alumni
Major League Baseball pitchers
Mexican League baseball pitchers
Montreal Expos players
New Haven Ravens players
New Orleans Zephyrs players
Ottawa Lynx players
Portland Sea Dogs players
Rockford Expos players
Sportspeople from Wheeling, West Virginia
Trenton Thunder players
Valley Vipers players
Wei Chuan Dragons players
Western Kentucky Hilltoppers baseball players